Bessie Buskirk (March 21, 1892 – November 19, 1952) was an actress on stage and in silent films in the United States. She was a child actress on stage before becoming a film actress as an adult. Already in 1900, she was appearing on stage. She appeared in several short films in 1915 and continued to be cast in various credited roles into 1917.

Early life 
She was born in Illinois. Her father was a stage carpenter before the family moved to Los Angeles.

Career 
She starred opposite Joseph Henabery in The Huron Converts and The Race Love in 1915. She portrayed Donalbain in Macbeth (1916 film). She also had credited roles in 1917 films.

Burial 
She is buried in the Angelus Rosedale Cemetery in Los Angeles.

Filmography 
 Farewell to Thee (1915) short film not to be confused with Aloha Oe (film)
 A Mother's Justice (1915)
 The Ever Living Isles (1915)
 The Huron Converts (1915) with Joseph Henabery, a Reliance Film
 The Race Love / The Race War (1915) with Joseph Henabery
 The House Built Upon Sand (1916)
 Macbeth (1916)
 Pet of Patagonia (1916)
 Her Official Fathers (1917)
 Cheerful Givers'' (1917)

References 

American silent film actresses
20th-century American actresses

1892 births
1952 deaths